Lakeview Christian School is a private prekindergarden-12th grade school founded in 1977. It is located in Marion, Grant County, Indiana, United States.

About
LCS is part of Lakeview Christian School Inc. which is accredited by the Association of Christian Schools International (ACSI) and the State of Indiana Department of Education.  As of the 2004-05 school year 270 students attended and the graduating class was 23 students.  Lakeview Christian School is operated as a ministry of Lakeview Wesleyan Church, Marion but accepts students from numerous Christian churches around the Grant County area.  The school was founded in 1977 out of the perceived need by the church's pastor and several families to "meet a growing community need for a private school which would be uniquely committed to quality academic opportunity and strong in moral and Christian teaching".

Athletics
Lakeview participates in inter-school sports under the auspices of the Indiana High School Athletic Association (IHSAA). It formerly operated as a member of the Midland Athletic Conference; however, after the disbanding of the conference following the 2009-2010 season, Lakeview now participates as an Independent.  The school sports mascot is the Lions.  Teams include boys' basketball, soccer, track, cross-country, baseball, golf and girls' basketball, soccer, softball, volleyball.

See also
 List of high schools in Indiana

References

External links
 Official site

Private high schools in Indiana
Schools in Grant County, Indiana
1977 establishments in Indiana